Sabrina Claudio (born September 19, 1996) is an American singer and songwriter. In late 2016, Claudio uploaded several songs to SoundCloud, before compiling a select collection as part of her debut extended play, Confidently Lost, which was released independently in March 2017. Her single "Unravel Me" peaked at number 22 on the Billboard Twitter Emerging Artists chart, and her single "Belong to You" peaked at number two on the same chart and was certified Gold by the RIAA. Her debut mixtape, About Time was released on October 5, 2017. It peaked at number 13 on Billboards Top R&B/Hip-Hop Albums chart.

Life and career
Claudio grew up in Fort Lauderdale. She is of Cuban and Puerto Rican descent. She later moved to Los Angeles, where she began her music career in earnest. She first began recording and releasing video covers on Twitter and YouTube before transitioning to original tracks which she released on SoundCloud. Over the course of 2016, Claudio released several singles, including "Runnin' Thru Lovers", "Orion's Belt", and Confidently Lost.

These songs would form part of her EP, Confidently Lost, which she originally released independently on SoundCloud. The EP received a wide release in March 2017 via SC Entertainment. In May 2017, she released a single, "Unravel Me", off of an upcoming project due to be released later in 2017. The song would go on to peak at #22 on the Billboard Twitter Emerging Artists chart. She released another single for that project entitled "Belong to You" in July 2017, which peaked at #2 on the same chart.

It was announced in August 2017 that Claudio would be touring North America with 6lack on his Free 6lack Tour.

On October 5, 2017, Claudio's debut full-length digital mixtape, About Time, was officially released. The mixtape is supported by the singles "Unravel Me" and "Belong to You". From October through November 2017, Apple Music promoted Claudio as their Up Next artist, a series that focuses on breakthrough artists by documenting their journey, inspiration and influences through exclusive interviews, live performances and a mini-documentary.

On April 2, 2018, Claudio released the single "All to You" followed by "Don't Let Me Down" featuring Khalid on April 4. Her debut studio album No Rain, No Flowers, was released on August 15, 2018, preceded by the single "Messages From Her". Her management is SAL&CO/Neal Atweh.

In 2022, Claudio was credited as a songwriter on "Plastic Off the Sofa", the eighth track on Beyoncé's seventh studio album, Renaissance, for which she received a nomination for Album of the Year at the 65th Annual Grammy Awards.

Controversies 

In April 2018, a series of screenshots began to circulate around the social media app Twitter showcasing Claudio's alleged use of several racial slurs, and other offensive language directed at Black women. She also was accused of using a second account on Twitter to share racist messages. Claudio issued a now-deleted apology on Twitter for her actions.

Tours

Headlining
 Sabrina Claudio – No Rain No Flowers Tour (2018)
 Sabrina Claudio – Truth Is Tour (2019)
 Based On A Feeling Tour (2022)

Supporting
 6lack – Free 6lack Tour (2017)

Discography

Studio albums

Mixtapes

Compilations

Extended plays

Singles

As lead artist

Promotional singles

As featured artist

Guest appearances

Music videos

References

External links 
 

1996 births
Living people
21st-century American musicians
21st-century American women singers
American contemporary R&B singers
American women pop singers
American women singer-songwriters
American musicians of Cuban descent
American musicians of Puerto Rican descent
Atlantic Records artists
Hispanic and Latino American musicians
Musicians from Miami
21st-century American singers
Hispanic and Latino American women singers
Singer-songwriters from Florida